Yaya Dukuly (born 17 January 2003) is a professional soccer player who plays as a winger for Championnat National 2 side Reims B. Born a Liberian refugee in Guinea, he has represented Australia at youth level.

Club career

Melbourne City
On 9 September 2019, Dukuly signed a two-year scholarship deal with Melbourne City. Dukuly made regular appearances for the club's youth side competing in the National Premier Leagues Victoria and Y-League. On 27 October 2020, Melbourne City announced that Dukuly had departed the club.

Adelaide United
Shortly after the announcement of Dukuly's departure from Melbourne City, Dukuly signed a one-year scholarship contract with Adelaide United ahead of the 2020–21 A-League season. Dukuly made his debut on 28 December 2020 in the opening A-League fixture against Western United where he was named in the starting lineup, he was later substituted in the 59th minute.

Personal life
Dukuly was born in Guinea to Liberian parents. He migrated to Australia at the age of 1.

References

External links

2003 births
Living people
Australian soccer players
Association football forwards
Melbourne City FC players
Adelaide United FC players
A-League Men players
Australian people of Liberian descent
Sportspeople of Liberian descent
Liberian emigrants to Australia
Naturalised citizens of Australia
Sportspeople from Conakry
People with acquired Liberian citizenship